Thiago Viana Modesto (born August 31, 1996) is a Brazilian singer, songwriter, blogger and musician. He is best known as the lead singer and bass player of the Brazilian alternative metal band Quimere, which he co-founded in 2015.

Biography
Modesto is the son of the preacher and Brazilian politician Claudio Modesto, and was born and raised in São Paulo. At the age of 12 he began writing the blog Maníacos por Futebol ("Football Maniacs"), which became known to the general public in 2010 when he was invited to cover the event Yahoo Penalty that counted on personalities like goalkeeper Zetti. Modesto also wrote for the Rawr blog. At age 15, in 2011, he was nominated for the "Muso do Ano" (beauty of the year) award by YouPIX. The same year he ended the activities on his blogs.

Modesto began his musical trajectory at age 14, playing in several garage bands. Joined the Dynastia band in 2013 where he played with his current bandmate Vitor Assan. With the end of the band both founded Quimere, band that remains until today.

References

External links

 
 MusicBrainz

1996 births
Living people
People from São Paulo
Brazilian people of Portuguese descent
Brazilian people of Italian descent
Brazilian people of indigenous peoples descent
Brazilian bass guitarists
Brazilian rock musicians
Musicians from São Paulo
Brazilian bloggers
Quimere members
21st-century bass guitarists